The 2009–10 Ligat Nashim was the 12th season of women's league football under the Israeli Football Association.

Two teams, ASA Tel Aviv University and Maccabi Kishronot Hadera topped the table with an equal number of points, and a play-off match was used to determine the champion, won 6–0 by ASA Tel Aviv University.

By winning, ASA Tel Aviv University qualified to 2010–11 UEFA Women's Champions League.

As the IFA decided to establish a second division for Ligat Nashim, the bottom four clubs were relegated at the end of the season.

League table

Top scorers

References

External links
Ligat Nashim 2009/2010 IFA 

Ligat Nashim seasons
1
women
Israel